Defending champion Andre Agassi won the men's singles tennis title at the 1996 Miami Open, after Goran Ivanišević was forced to retire from the final with the score at 3–0 to Agassi in the first set. The start of the final had already been delayed for 45 minutes while Ivanišević received treatment. Ivanišević had slept awkwardly the night before the final and had woken up that morning with a very stiff neck.

Seeds
All thirty-two seeds received a bye to the second round.

Draw

Finals

Top half

Section 1

Section 2

Section 3

Section 4

Bottom half

Section 5

Section 6

Section 7

Section 8

Qualifying

Qualifying seeds

Qualifiers

Qualifying draw

First qualifier

Second qualifier

Third qualifier

Fourth qualifier

Fifth qualifier

Sixth qualifier

Seventh qualifier

Eighth qualifier

Ninth qualifier

Tenth qualifier

Eleventh qualifier

Twelfth qualifier

References

External links
 Main draw
 ITF tournament profile

Men's Singles
Lipton Championships - Men's Singles